Anne or Ann Baker may refer to:

Anne Baker (biographer) (born 1914), British writer of historical biographies, daughter of Geoffrey Salmond
Anne Elizabeth Baker (1786–1861), English philologist, historian and illustrator
Ann Baker (born 1930), American television and film character actor
Ann Baker (singer) (1915–1999), American jazz singer